"Everything a Man Could Ever Need" is a song written by Mac Davis, and recorded by American country music artist Glen Campbell. It was released in June 1970 as the first single from his album Norwood. The song peaked at number 5 on the Billboard Hot Country Singles chart. It also reached number 1 on the RPM Country Tracks chart in Canada.

Chart performance (Campbell version)

Cover versions
The song was also recorded by Roy Drusky for his 1970 album All My Hard Times.
Australian Matt Flinders covered the song on his 1972 album Matt Flinders On Television.

Popular culture
Glen Campbell's version was also used in the 2002 movie Heartlands, starring Michael Sheen and Mark Addy.

References

1970 singles
Glen Campbell songs
Roy Drusky songs
Songs written by Mac Davis
Capitol Records singles
1970 songs